Tsampa or Tsamba is a Tibetan and Himalayan staple foodstuff, particularly prominent in the central part of the region. It is glutinous meal made from roasted flour, usually barley flour and sometimes also wheat flour. It is usually mixed with the salty Tibetan butter tea. It is also eaten in Turkestan and Mongolia, where it is known as zamba.

Preparation

As the flour has already been roasted Tsampa is quite simple to prepare and does not need to be cooked; indeed, it is known as a convenience food and often used by the Tibetans, Sherpas, nomads and other travellers. While traditional tsampa is prepared with tea, sometimes water or beer is used in its place. It may also be prepared as a porridge which is called a "jham-thoo" which is usually sweet and nutty and prepared with Tibetan cheese, butter, tea and sugar. Tsampa is also prepared in a congee with lamb or yak stock to make a congee which is called "tsam-thug". André Migot described its preparation:

Cultural significance

Besides constituting a substantial, arguably predominant part of the Tibetan diet, its prominence also derives from the tradition of throwing pinches of tsampa in the air during many Buddhist rituals. It is believed that tsampa-throwing actually predates Buddhist beliefs in the area and was originally used as an offering to animistic gods to request their protection. The tradition was consequently incorporated into Buddhism as a "mark of joy and celebration" used at celebratory occasions such as marriages and birthdays. Today it is particularly known in that regard for its use in New Year celebrations, where it is accompanied by chanted verses expressing the desire for good luck in the forthcoming year, for both oneself and others. Tsampa-throwing also occurs at most Buddhist funerals, where the action is intended to release the soul of the deceased.

Tsampa is used in a number of other ways. Mashes of tsampa and cumin are sometimes applied to toothaches or other sore spots. Tsampa is also known among Tibetan sportsmen for its ability to provide rapid energy boosts; the roasting of the flour breaks it down to an easily digestible state, allowing the calories therein to be quickly incorporated by the body.

Reflecting its foundational role in Tibetan culture, "Tsampa" is also the name of a Tibetan typeface.

Political significance
The phrase "tsampa-eater" was used to promote a unified Tibetan identity. Whereas Tibetans speak various dialects, worship in different sects, and live in different regions, all Tibetans were thought to eat tsampa. In 1957, the India-based Tibet Mirror addressed a letter to "all tsampa-eaters", encouraging them to participate in what would become the 1959 Tibetan Rebellion. Recently, with the rise of the Tibetan diaspora, less emphasis has been placed on tsampa and more emphasis on Tibetan Buddhism in constructing a unified Tibetan identity.

See also

 Brenntar Traditional Swabian staple foodstuff similar to Tsampa.
 Talkkuna Traditional Finnish, Estonian and Russian staple foodstuff similar to Tsampa.
 Brose
 Chatang
 Gundain
 Gyabrag
 Gofio
 Hardtack
 Kama (food)
 Misutgaru
 Parched grain
 Tibetan cuisine
 List of porridges
 List of Tibetan dishes

References

External links
 Tsampa section at tsampa.org 
  Throwing tsampa in the air 
  Nutritive value of barley
 Chronique culinaire indo-népalaise 
 Tsampa Ildiko (fr-de-nl-en)
  Sonam’s Tsampa 

Tibetan cuisine
Mongolian cuisine
Uyghur cuisine
Indian cuisine
Nepalese cuisine
Central Asian cuisine
Staple foods
Porridges
Barley-based dishes